Norman Banks  (born 4 April 1954) is an Anglican bishop. Since 2011, he has been the Bishop of Richborough, the provincial episcopal visitor for the eastern half of the Church of England Province of Canterbury.

Early life
Banks was born on 4 April 1954. He studied at Oriel College, Oxford before then studying for ordination at St Stephen's House, Oxford.

Ordained ministry
He was an assistant curate at Christ Church and St Ann's, Newcastle from 1982 to 1987 and priest in charge until 1990. He was Vicar of St Paul's, Whitley Bay, from 1990 until 2000. Latterly he was Vicar of Walsingham.

Episcopal ministry
Banks was appointed the third Bishop of Richborough. On 16 June 2011, he was consecrated as a bishop at Southwark Cathedral by Rowan Williams, the Archbishop of Canterbury. As Bishop of Richborough, he is the provincial episcopal visitor for the eastern half of the Province of Canterbury. He acted as principal consecrator during the episcopal ordination of Will Hazlewood on 15 July 2020.

Banks is a member of the Council of Bishops of The Society.

Styles
The Reverend Norman Banks (1982–2011)
The Right Reverend Norman Banks (2011–present)

References

1954 births
Living people
Alumni of Oriel College, Oxford
Alumni of St Stephen's House, Oxford
Honorary Chaplains to the Queen
Bishops of Richborough
21st-century Church of England bishops
Anglo-Catholic bishops
English Anglo-Catholics